The Sabah FK 2018–19 season was Sabah's first Azerbaijan Premier League season, and their second season in existence.

Squad

Transfers

In

Out

Released

Trial

Friendlies

Competitions

Premier League

Results summary

Results

League table

Azerbaijan Cup

Squad statistics

Appearances and goals

|-
|colspan="14"|Players away on loan:
|-
|colspan="14"|Players who left Sabah during the season:

|}

Goal scorers

Disciplinary record

References

Azerbaijani football clubs 2018–19 season
Sabah FC (Azerbaijan) seasons